Sutonocrea reducta is a moth in the family Erebidae. It was described by Francis Walker in 1856. It is found in Brazil and Costa Rica.

References

Moths described in 1856
Phaegopterina